Cedric Levan Richmond (born September 13, 1973) is an American attorney, politician, and political advisor who is serving as senior advisor to the Democratic National Committee. Richmond was previously a senior advisor to the president and director of the White House Office of Public Engagement in the Biden administration. A member of the Democratic Party, he was the U.S. representative for Louisiana's 2nd congressional district from 2011 to 2021. His district included most of New Orleans.

From 2017 to 2019, Richmond chaired the Congressional Black Caucus. Beginning with his third term, he was the only Louisiana Democrat serving in either chamber of Congress. He represented New Orleans to the Louisiana State House from 2000 to 2011. In 2019, he was named the first national co-chair of Joe Biden's 2020 presidential campaign. On September 5, 2020, he was named a co-chair of Biden's presidential transition. On November 17, 2020, Richmond announced he would leave Congress in January 2021 to serve as Senior Advisor to the President and director of the Office of Public Liaison, which Biden renamed the White House Office of Public Engagement.

Early life and education
Richmond was born in New Orleans in 1973 and raised in New Orleans East, where he attended public schools. His father died when he was seven years old. His mother was a public school teacher and small business owner. Richmond graduated from Benjamin Franklin High School. He earned a Bachelor of Arts from Morehouse College, and a Juris Doctor from Tulane School of Law. He also completed an executive program at Harvard University's John F. Kennedy School of Government. While at Morehouse, Richmond played college baseball as a pitcher for the Morehouse Maroon Tigers in the Southern Intercollegiate Athletic Conference.

Louisiana legislature

Richmond was elected and served as the Louisiana State Representative for the 101st district (Orleans Parish) from 2000 to 2011. He was elected shortly after his 27th birthday and was one of the youngest legislators ever to serve in Louisiana when he took office. He served as the Chairman of the Committee on Judiciary and a member of the Ways and Means, House Executive, and Legislative Audit Advisory committees.

U.S. House of Representatives
In 2010, Richmond was elected to the US House of Representatives from Louisiana's 2nd congressional district for the first time. He took office in 2011. He was reelected in 2012, 2014, 2016, 2018, and 2020.

On June 9, 2014, Richmond introduced the Honor Flight Act (H.R. 4812; 113th Congress), a bill that would direct the Transportation Security Administration (TSA) to establish a process for providing expedited and dignified passenger screening services for veterans traveling on an Honor Flight to visit war memorials that had been built to honor their service.

That year Richmond defended his Republican colleague Vance McAllister, who had become embroiled in an alleged adultery scandal. It was a rare across-the-aisle gesture. Richmond said that he associated the controversy around McAllister with "gotcha moments" in which the "two parties in this country have gone overboard...and taken joy in the pain of their supposed opponents".

Richmond was one of a few Democrats who voted to authorize the Keystone XL pipeline. He is the fifth-biggest recipient of money from fossil fuel donors among House Democrats. The League of Conservation Voters gave him one of the lowest ratings for any Democrat in Congress.

Richmond has been active in the Congressional Black Caucus, made up of African-American legislators who work together to have their views heard. On November 30, 2016, he was elected chair of the caucus for the 115th United States Congress.

On December 18, 2019, Richmond voted to impeach President Donald Trump.

Elections

2008

Richmond came in third place in the seven-candidate primary election for the Democratic nomination for Louisiana's 2nd congressional district, behind U.S. Representative William J. Jefferson and television newscaster Helena Moreno. During a primary debate, Richmond accused Moreno of drug use, and she attacked him based on his disqualification from the 2005 New Orleans City Council "D" district election.

Later in 2008, the Louisiana Supreme Court suspended Richmond's law license for six months in a 5–2 decision. It found that he had falsified a sworn statement claiming more than two years of residency in New Orleans's "D" district in order to be eligible for the district's city council seat.

2010

Richmond was the first candidate in the 2010 elections to have President Barack Obama appear in a television ad on his behalf.

Most analysts considered Richmond a strong favorite to retake this seat for the Democrats, even in what was forecast to be a Republican year nationally. With a Cook Partisan Voting Index of D+25, the 2nd was the most Democratic district in the country to be represented by a Republican. In 2008 Obama had carried it with 74% of the vote, his fifth-best performance in a Southern district and his 35th best nationally.

Richmond won the November 2 election with 65% of the vote.

2012

2020

Richmond's campaign received almost $113,000 from the oil and gas sector, which donated more than any other sector to his campaign. He was reelected with 63.6% of the vote.

Committee assignments
Committee on Homeland Security
Subcommittee on Cybersecurity, Infrastructure Protection, and Security Technologies (Chair)
Subcommittee on Emergency Preparedness, Response, and Recovery
Committee on the Judiciary
Subcommittee on Courts, Intellectual Property, and the Internet
Subcommittee on Crime, Terrorism, and Homeland Security

Congressional caucuses
Congressional Black Caucus
New Democrat Coalition

Controversies
In January 2017, Richmond became involved in an argument with Republican lawmakers over whether a particular painting should continue to hang in the Capitol. The painting in question shows police officers apprehending suspects, and the police are depicted as pigs. It was painted by someone from Richmond's district who had won a local award, and Republicans objected to it. Richmond said that escalating the issue might "open up Pandora's Box" because there are other paintings that some people might also find offensive.

In March 2017, Richmond was criticized for making a crude joke about a controversial photograph of Kellyanne Conway kneeling on the Oval Office couch. Richmond appeared to compare Conway to Monica Lewinsky, saying, "I really just want to know what was going on there, because she really looked kind of familiar there in that position there. But don't answer. And I don't want you to refer back to the '90s." Richmond later said the joke was not meant to be sexual. "Since some people have interpreted my joke to mean something that it didn’t I think it is important to clarify what I meant", he said in a statement. "Where I grew up saying that someone is looking or acting ‘familiar’ simply means that they are behaving too comfortably."

Congressional Baseball Game

Richmond played in the annual Congressional Baseball Game. He was the starting Democratic pitcher for each of the five years since his election and the Democrats won each game. He had a 2.85 earned run average, 1.67 walks plus hits per inning pitched and 45 strikeouts in his 27 innings pitched in that span. In 2016 Republican team manager Joe Barton called him the best player to ever participate in the game. Richmond lost his first game in 2016, a day after participating through the night in the 2016 United States House of Representatives sit-in.

Biden administration

Richmond was a national co-chair of the Joe Biden 2020 presidential campaign. On November 17, 2020, he announced that he would join the Biden administration as Senior Advisor to the President and director of the White House Office of Public Liaison. His resignation became official on January 15, 2021. His departure triggered a 2021 special election. Justice Democrats criticized Richmond's appointment, alleging that he was one of the top Democratic recipients of donations from the fossil fuel industry.

In an interview before Biden's swearing-in, Richmond noted his potential work in reaching out to conservatives in different parts of the country. Richmond was reportedly working with the Biden administration on addressing reparations for slavery.

Richmond resigned from the White House on May 18, 2022, for a job at the Democratic National Committee.

Electoral history
U.S. Representative, 2nd Congressional District November Election, 2016

U.S. Representative, 2nd Congressional District-November Election, 2014

U.S. Representative, 2nd Congressional District-November Election, 2012

U.S. Representative, 2nd Congressional District-Democratic Party, 2010
August 28, 2010

U.S. Representative, 2nd Congressional District-Democratic Party, 2008

Threshold > 50%

First Ballot, November 2, 2004

Louisiana State Representative, 101st District, 2007

October 20, 2007

Louisiana State Representative, 101st District, 2003

October 4, 2003

Louisiana State Representative, 101st District, 1999

Threshold > 50%

First Ballot, October 23, 1999

Second Ballot, November 20, 1999

See also
List of African-American United States representatives

Notes

References

External links

|-

|-

|-

|-

|-

1973 births
Living people
21st-century American politicians
African-American members of the United States House of Representatives
African-American people in Louisiana politics
African-American state legislators in Louisiana
Assistants to the President of the United States
Biden administration personnel
Democratic Party members of the United States House of Representatives from Louisiana
Joe Biden 2020 presidential campaign
Lawyers from New Orleans
Democratic Party members of the Louisiana House of Representatives
Morehouse College alumni
Morehouse Maroon Tigers baseball players
Politicians from New Orleans
Senior Advisors to the President of the United States
Tulane University Law School alumni